The 25th Awit Awards were held on November 27, 2012, at the Glorietta located in Ayala Center, Makati. They gave excellences to the best of Filipino music for the year 2011.
 
Jonathan Ong led the nominations with seven. He was followed by Noel Cabangon, Ebe Dancel and Jonathan Manalo, each receiving five nominations.

The awards ceremony was hosted by Denise Laurel, Krista Kleiner and the twins Anthony and David Semerad. Jonathan Ong took home most of the awards with three. Special citation was given to Jose Mari Chan for being the first Filipino artist to receive a tribute album created by foreign artists. The album was known as The Manhattan Connection, The Songs of Jose Mari Chan by the American vocal group, The Manhattan Transfer. Special citations were also given to Ronnie Ricketts, the Optical Media Board chairman and James Dy for their campaign against piracy.

Winners and nominees
Winners are listed first and highlighted in bold. Nominated producers, composers and lyricists are not included in this list, unless noted. For the full list, please go to their official website.

Performance Awards

Creativity Awards

Technical Achievement Awards

Digital Awards

Note:

The awards were given specifically to the composers, instead of the recording artists/groups.

Special Awards

Performers
This is in alphabetical order.

References

External links
 Official Website of the Awit Awards

Awit Awards
2012 music awards
Awit